Quantico is an American drama thriller series that premiered on September 27, 2015, on American Broadcasting Company (ABC). Created by Joshua Safran, who also served as showrunner and an executive producer along with Mark Gordon, Robert Sertner and Nicholas Pepper. In its third season, Safron was replaced by Michael Seitzman, who served as the showrunner as well as an executive producer. The series followed a group of young FBI recruits, or New Agent Trainees (NATs), each with a specific reason for joining the FBI Academy in Quantico, Virginia.

Priyanka Chopra stars as Alex Parrish who, after graduating from the academy, joins the agency. She later becomes a prime suspect for masterminding a bombing at the Grand Central Terminal, the biggest terror attack on New York City since the September 11 attacks. The series (up to the 35th episode) featured two timelines: the present, where Parrish runs from captivity to prove her innocence, and the past, which showed her and her fellow recruits training at the academy while revealing various detail about their previous lives. Halfway through the second season, it switched to one timeline. Every episode's title for the first season is the last word spoken in that episode, while for the second season, the episode's titles are CIA cryptonyms.

Quanticos first-season episodes were primarily shot in Montreal; the second season production was moved to New York. The series' episodes are available for download at the iTunes Store and Amazon Video. The episodes are also available to stream on Netflix. All episodes are approximately 43 minutes excluding commercials and are available in both high-definition and standard.

The first 30 episodes were broadcast on Sunday nights at 10:00 pm Eastern Standard Time (EST), before shifting to Monday nights at 10:00 pm. The series then moved to Thursday nights at 10:00 pm for its third season. On May 11, 2018, after only three of the thirteen episodes in the season had aired, ABC announced the cancellation of the series. However, the network announced that the remaining ten episodes would be burned off on Friday nights at 8:00 pm. The final episode of the series aired on August 3, 2018.

Series overview

Episodes

Season 1 (2015–16)

Season 2 (2016–17)

Season 3 (2018)

Ratings

References 

General references

External links 

Lists of American espionage television series episodes
Quantico (TV series)